Ken Quinney (born May 23, 1965) is a Canadian former professional ice hockey player. He played parts of three seasons for the Quebec Nordiques, scoring 7 goals and 13 assists in 59 games. Most of his career was spent in the AHL, IHL, and the DEL in Europe.

Personal life
His son, Gage Quinney, signed a two-year, entry level contract with the Vegas Golden Knights in 2018.

Awards
 WHL East First All-Star Team – 1985

References

External links

1965 births
Adirondack Red Wings players
Calgary Wranglers (WHL) players
Canadian ice hockey left wingers
Frankfurt Lions players
Fredericton Express players
Halifax Citadels players
Ice hockey people from British Columbia
Las Vegas Thunder players
Living people
Sportspeople from New Westminster
Quebec Nordiques draft picks
Quebec Nordiques players
Canadian expatriate ice hockey players in Germany